Andrew John Refshauge (born on 16 January 1949) is a former Australian politician who was Deputy Premier of New South Wales from 1995 to 2005, a member of the New South Wales Legislative Assembly between 1983 and 2005, and a senior minister in the Carr ministry.

Background and early career

Refshauge was born in Melbourne, the son of Major General Sir William Refshauge  who later became Honorary Physician to Queen Elizabeth II and Director-General of the Commonwealth Department of Health. He has three brothers and one sister. One brother, Richard Refshauge, was a Judge of the ACT Supreme Court. His sister, Kathryn Refshauge, is the Dean of the Faculty of Health Sciences at the University of Sydney.

He helped establish Aboriginal Medical Services in Wilcannia and Kempsey.

Political career
Angered by the dismissal of the Whitlam Government, Refshauge joined the Australian Labor Party. In 1983 he was elected to the New South Wales Legislative Assembly as the member for Marrickville on the same day that Bob Carr was elected the member for Maroubra in by-elections. He served in a variety of portfolios, as well as rising to be the leader of the left faction of the party, Deputy Leader of the Opposition in 1988, and Deputy Premier in 1995 following the election of the Carr government.

Refshauge was the Legislative Assembly representative on the Senate of the University of Sydney between 1987 and 1988 and was the Deputy Leader of the Opposition between 11 April 1988 and 4 April 1995. Prior to entering politics he was a member of the Aboriginal Affairs Policy Committee (1981–1986). Refshauge was a delegate to Labor's State Conference (1984–2005); an executive committee member of the H.V. Evatt Memorial Foundation; a board member of the  Mandela Foundation; and a Fellow of the Senate of the University of Sydney (1983–1986).

During his term in parliament, Refshauge served as minister between 1995 and 2005 in portfolios covering Health, Aboriginal Affairs,  Urban Affairs and Planning, Housing, Education and Training, State Development and as Treasurer.

Refshauge announced his resignation from Parliament, as Deputy Premier and from the ministry in August 2005, a few days after Bob Carr announced his retirement as Premier and from Parliament. Refshauge originally had planned to retire at the 2007 election but was prompted to go earlier with Carr's retirement and a request by the replacement premier, Morris Iemma that Refshauge stand aside to allow for a new Deputy Premier so that there could be a new leadership team.

Career after politics
Refshauge presently holds a number of senior community leadership roles, including the Chairman of CareFlight (NSW), since December  2007; a director of Family Care Medical Services, since 2007; a director of the Aged Care Standards Accreditation Agency, since 2008 and Chair since 1 July 2012; and the Chair of the Investment Committee of the Aboriginal Land Council of New South Wales, since 2008.

He has previously served in a range of other community roles, including the Chair of the Australian Institute of Health and Welfare; a director of the Prince of Wales Medical Research Institute, later to become Neuroscience Research Australia; a member of the Foundation for Research and Treatment of Alcoholism and Drug Dependence; and a director of the Family Care Medical Services.

References

Further reading
 
 

Deputy Premiers of New South Wales
1949 births
Living people
Labor Left politicians
Members of the New South Wales Legislative Assembly
People educated at Canberra Grammar School
People educated at Scotch College, Melbourne
Politicians from Melbourne
Australian Labor Party members of the Parliament of New South Wales
20th-century Australian medical doctors
21st-century Australian politicians
Treasurers of New South Wales